Whitney is an unincorporated community in St. Clair County, Alabama, United States.

History
Whitney was named for Charles Whitney, a member of the Alabama Legislature following the Civil War. A post office was established under the name Whitney in 1875 and was in operation until 1967.

References

Unincorporated communities in St. Clair County, Alabama
Unincorporated communities in Alabama